Matteo Pessina  (born 21 April 1997) is an Italian professional footballer who plays as a midfielder. He is captain of  club Monza, on loan from Atalanta. He also plays for the Italy national team.

Coming through the youth system, Pessina started his career at Monza. He joined AC Milan in 2015, who sent him on loan to Lecce, Catania and Como. In 2017, he moved to Atalanta, and was loaned out to Spezia and Hellas Verona. Pessina became a starter for Atalanta upon his return from loan in 2020. He returned to his hometown club Monza in 2022 and was made club captain.

Pessina represented Italy internationally at under-19, under-20 and under-21 levels, before making his senior debut in 2020. He was part of Italy's squad at UEFA Euro 2020, where he scored two goals to help his side win the competition.

Club career

Monza 
Born in Monza, Italy, Pessina began his youth career at local club La Dominante aged five. In 2007, aged 10, Pessina joined Monza's youth sector. He made his senior debut for Monza on 2 October 2013, in a Coppa Italia Lega Pro game against AlbinoLeffe.

Pessina was made a permanent member of the first team in the 2014–15 season; he made his league debut on 6 January 2015, in which he also scored a goal, against Pro Patria. Pessina finished the season with three goals in 20 appearances in the regular season of the Lega Pro, as well as three goals in two games in the relegation play-outs, won against Pordenone.

AC Milan 
Despite avoiding relegation, Monza was forced to restart from the Serie D due to a bankruptcy: Pessina became a free agent, and was signed by AC Milan on 30 June 2015.

Loans to Lecce, Catania and Como 
Pessina was promptly sent on loan to Lecce in the Lega Pro in August 2015. During the 2015–16 season, Pessina was used infrequently: he only made one appearance in the Coppa Italia Lega Pro and three in the league.

In January 2016, the loan was interrupted and Pessina was loaned out to Catania. Even in his second loan spell, he was used infrequently, playing only one league game in the second half of the season.

In summer 2016, Pessina was loaned out to Como. He played as a starter in the 2016–17 season, making two appearances in the Coppa Italia, three in the Coppa Italia Lega Pro, 35 in the league (scoring nine goals) and one in the promotion play-offs.

Atalanta 
On 7 July 2017, Pessina signed a contract with Atalanta, as part of a swap deal involving Andrea Conti moving the other way.

Loan to Spezia 
On 25 August 2017, Pessina was signed on loan by Serie B side Spezia. He scored his first Serie B goal against Salernitana on 23 February 2018. Due to his performances, having scored two goals in 38 appearances, Pessina was nominated Best Young Player of the Serie B at the Serie B Gran Galà Top 11.

Return to Atalanta 
In summer 2018, Pessina returned to Atalanta. He made his debut on 26 July, playing the first leg of the second qualifying round of the UEFA Europa League as a starter, in a 2–2 home draw against Sarajevo; it was also his debut in UEFA club competition. He made his Serie A debut on 20 August 2018, aged 21, replacing Mario Pašalić in the second half of the first matchday, a 4–0 home win against Frosinone. He made 19 appearances in all competitions, including five in the preliminary rounds of the Europa League and two in the Coppa Italia.

Loan to Hellas Verona 
In August 2019, Pessina joined newly-promoted Serie A side Hellas Verona on loan with an option to buy. On his debut, six days later, he scored his first Serie A goal in a 1–0 win against Lecce in the second matchday. Pessina ended the 2019–20 season with seven goals in 35 league appearances.

Starter at Atalanta 
After returning from loan in summer 2020, Pessina made his UEFA Champions League debut with Atalanta on 21 October, in a 4–0 win against Midtjylland. Starting from November, Pessina started finding more space in Atalanta's starting lineup; on 3 January 2021, he scored his first goal with Atalanta, in a 5–1 home win over Sassuolo. In the second leg of the Coppa Italia semi-final, he scored a brace in a 3–1 win against Napoli, which allowed Atalanta to progress to the final.

On 29 September 2021, he scored the sole goal in a win against Young Boys on the second matchday of the Champions League group stage: it was his first goal in a UEFA competition.

Loan to Monza 
On 6 July 2022, Pessina returned to his former club Monza, who had been promoted to the Serie A for the first time in their history; he joined on a one-year loan, with an option and conditional obligation for purchase, and was made club captain. He made his debut on 26 August, as a substitute in a 2–1 home defeat to Udinese. On 2 October, Pessina scored his first Serie A goal for Monza in a 3–0 away win to Sampdoria.

International career

Youth 
Pessina was a member of the Italy U20 side that finished in third place at the 2017 FIFA U-20 World Cup. He made his debut with the U21 team on 5 October 2017, in a 6–2 friendly win against Hungary in Budapest.

Senior 
Pessina was called up to the Italy senior squad by manager Roberto Mancini in November 2020, and made his senior debut for Italy on 11 November, featuring as a substitute in a 4–0 friendly win against Estonia in Florence. On 28 May 2021, Pessina scored his first goal for Italy in the 75th minute of a 7–0 home win in a friendly against San Marino; he scored a second goal in the 87th minute.

In June 2021, he was included in Italy's preliminary squad for UEFA Euro 2020 by manager Roberto Mancini, but he was initially left out of the final 26-man squad for the tournament. However, following an injury to Stefano Sensi, Pessina was called up to the tournament in his place.

He made his first appearance in the tournament as a late substitute in Italy's group match against Switzerland on 16 June, a 3–0 win for Italy. He then started in the match against Wales on 20 June, scoring the only goal of the match in the team's 1–0 victory in Rome; the result allowed them to top their group. On 26 June, after coming off the bench for Nicolò Barella, Pessina scored the match-winning goal in a 2–1 win in extra-time over Austria in the round of 16, which allowed Italy to progress to the quarter-finals. On 11 July, Pessina won the European Championship with Italy following a 3–2 penalty shoot-out victory over England at Wembley Stadium in the final, after a 1–1 draw in extra-time.

On 20 November 2022, Pessina came on as a substitute in a 2–0 friendly defeat to Austria, becoming Monza's first-ever player to play for the Italy national team.

Style of play
Primarily an offensive-minded central midfielder, known as the mezzala role in Italian football jargon, Pessina is also capable of playing as an attacking midfielder or even as a winger. A left-footed player, he possesses good technique, and is known for his ability to create chances for teammates or make late attacking runs off the ball into the penalty area; he is also known for his defensive qualities and work-rate. In his position, he has been likened to midfielders Steven Gerrard and Frank Lampard for his surging runs and eye for goal. He has cited both English midfielders among his idols growing up.

Personal life 
Pessina studied economics at the LUISS Business School in Rome, Italy.

Career statistics

Club

International

Scores and results list Italy's goal tally first, score column indicates score after each Pessina goal.

Honours
Italy U20
 FIFA U-20 World Cup third place: 2017

Italy
 UEFA European Championship: 2020

Orders
 5th Class / Knight: Cavaliere Ordine al Merito della Repubblica Italiana: 2021

References

External links
 
 
 
 
 

1997 births
Living people
People from Brianza
Sportspeople from Monza
Footballers from Lombardy
Association football midfielders
Italian footballers
A.C. Monza players
A.C. Milan players
U.S. Lecce players
Catania S.S.D. players
Como 1907 players
Atalanta B.C. players
Spezia Calcio players
Hellas Verona F.C. players
Serie C players
Serie B players
Serie A players
Italy youth international footballers
Italy under-21 international footballers
Italy international footballers
UEFA Euro 2020 players
UEFA European Championship-winning players
Knights of the Order of Merit of the Italian Republic